Jerry Aaron Yates (born 10 November 1996) is an English professional footballer who plays as a forward for Blackpool. He has previously played for Rotherham United, Harrogate Town, Carlisle United and Swindon Town.

Career
Yates began his youth career at Doncaster Rovers. He joined Rotherham United in his late teens.

Rotherham United
Yates signed professionally for Rotherham United in 2014. He scored his first senior goal while on loan at Harrogate Railway Athletic in February 2015. He made his debut in the Football League on 3 April 2015, coming on as an 85th-minute substitute for Richard Smallwood in a 2–1 defeat to Birmingham City at St Andrew's. He had a loan spell with Harrogate Town cut short during the 2015–16 season as the Millers needed cover due to injuries. During Yates's loan spell at Harrogate Town he totalled eight appearances and scored four goals. He scored his first professional goals for Rotherham when he scored twice in a 5–4 EFL Cup loss against Morecambe on 9 August 2016. On 14 January 2017 he scored the opening goal against Norwich City on his full league debut. Rotherham United went on to win the game 2–1.

Yates would make 20 appearances throughout the 2017–18 season, helping Rotherham achieve promotion via the EFL League One play-offs.

Carlisle United loan
On 20 July 2018, Yates headed out on loan to League Two side Carlisle United until January for the 2018–19 season. He scored his first goal for Carlisle in a 3-2 EFL Trophy win over Morecambe on 4 September 2018. Yates scored an 88th-minute winner in a 2–1 win at home to Macclesfield Town in Carlisle's last match of 2018. It was his sixth goal in as many games. Yates was recalled by Rotherham on 1 January to provide cover for injuries.

Swindon Town loan
On 20 June 2019, Yates joined League Two team Swindon Town on a season-long loan. He scored his first goal for Swindon in a 2–0 win away to Scunthorpe on the opening weekend of the EFL League Two season. He scored his second goal in a 3–2 win at home to his old club, Carlisle on 10 August 2019. After scoring twelve goals in the first half of the season, he was recalled early from his loan spell on 21 January 2020. On 29 January 2020 Yates rejoined Swindon Town on loan until the end season.

Blackpool
Yates joined Blackpool for an undisclosed fee on 21 July 2020, signing a three-year contract, with the club having the option to extend it for a further year. He scored his first goals for the club when he netted twice in a 2–1 win over Burton Albion on 31 October 2020.

Yates ended the 2020–21 season as Blackpool's top scorer, with 23 goals. 20 of those came in the League, which is the joint-highest total scored by a Blackpool player since Andy Watson in 1993–94.

Yates was voted the PFA Fans' Player of the Year for the 2020–21 League One campaign. He signed a new three-year contract with the club on 23 July 2021. It included an option for a further twelve months.

At the start to the 2022–23 season, seven goals and an assist across seven matches saw Yates win the EFL Championship Player of the Month award for October 2022.

Career statistics

Honours
Rotherham United
EFL League One play-offs: 2018

Swindon Town
EFL League Two: 2019–20

Blackpool
EFL League One play-offs: 2021

Individual
PFA Team of the Year: 2019–20 League Two
Rotherham United Young Player of the Year: 2014–15, 2016–17
EFL Championship Player of the Month: October 2022

References

External links

1996 births
Living people
English footballers
Association football forwards
Footballers from Doncaster
Rotherham United F.C. players
Harrogate Town A.F.C. players
Carlisle United F.C. players
Swindon Town F.C. players
Blackpool F.C. players
English Football League players
National League (English football) players